The 2017 M&M's 200 presented by Casey's General Store was the ninth stock car race of the 2017 NASCAR Camping World Truck Series and the fourth iteration of the event. The race was held on Friday, June 23, 2017, in Newton, Iowa at Iowa Speedway, a  permanent D-shaped oval racetrack. The race took the scheduled 200 laps to complete. At race's end, John Hunter Nemechek, driving for NEMCO Motorsports, would complete a comeback victory on the final restart with six to go to win his fifth career NASCAR Camping World Truck Series win and his second and final wins of the season. To fill out the podium, Johnny Sauter of GMS Racing and Brandon Jones of MDM Motorsports would finish second and third, respectively.

Background 

Iowa Speedway is a 7/8-mile (1.4 km) paved oval motor racing track in Newton, Iowa, United States, approximately 30 miles (48 km) east of Des Moines. The track was designed with influence from Rusty Wallace and patterned after Richmond Raceway, a short track where Wallace was very successful. It has over 25,000 permanent seats as well as a unique multi-tiered Recreational Vehicle viewing area along the backstretch.

Entry list 

 (R) denotes rookie driver.
 (i) denotes driver who is ineligible for series driver points.

Practice

First practice 
The first practice session was held on Friday, June 23, at 9:00 AM CST, and would last for an hour and 25 minutes.

Second and final practice 
The second and final practice session, sometimes referred to as Happy Hour, was held on Friday, June 23, at 11:15 AM CST, and would last for an hour.

Qualifying 
Qualifying was held on Friday, June 23, at 5:05 PM CST. Since Iowa Speedway is under 1.5 miles (2.4 km), the qualifying system was a multi-car system that included three rounds. The first round was 15 minutes, where every driver would be able to set a lap within the 15 minutes. Then, the second round would consist of the fastest 24 cars in Round 1, and drivers would have 10 minutes to set a lap. Round 3 consisted of the fastest 12 drivers from Round 2, and the drivers would have 5 minutes to set a time. Whoever was fastest in Round 3 would win the pole.

Jennifer Jo Cobb was the only driver to fail to qualify.

Full qualifying results

Race results 
Stage 1 Laps: 60

Stage 2 Laps: 60

Stage 3 Laps: 80

Standings after the race 

Drivers' Championship standings

Note: Only the first 8 positions are included for the driver standings.

References 

2017 NASCAR Camping World Truck Series
NASCAR races at Iowa Speedway
June 2017 sports events in the United States
2017 in sports in Iowa